Panic is the seventh studio album by punk rock band MxPx.

Release
On May 5, 2005, Panic was announced for release the following month; alongside, its artwork and track listing was posted online. "Heard That Sound" was released to radio on May 17, 2005. Three days later, "The Darkest Places" was posted on the band's Myspace profile. Panic was made available for streaming on May 30, 2005, before it was released on June 7, 2005 through SideOneDummy Records. It featured the Blink-182/+44 singer-bassist Mark Hoppus on "Wrecking Hotel Rooms". On June 30, 2005, the music video for "Heard That Sound" was posted online, following which they appeared on the 2005 Warped Tour. "Wrecking Hotel Rooms" was released to radio on July 26, 2005. In October and November 2005, they supported Relient K on their headlining US tour. In January 2006, the band went on a co-headlining UK tour with the Starting Line, with support from the Matches and I Am the Avalanche. In March 2006, they went on a Canadian tour, which was followed by a handful of shows in the US and Japan. They then supported Reel Big Fish on their headlining US tour, and appeared at the Lifest and Cornerstone Festival in July 2006.

Track listing

Personnel
 Mike Herrera – bass guitar, lead vocals
 Yuri Ruley – drums, percussion, backing vocals, choir, chorus
 Tom Wisniewski – guitar, backing vocals, choir, chorus

Additional personnel
 James Barrett – backing vocals, choir, chorus
 Patti Day – choir, chorus
 Mark Hoppus – background vocals on "Wrecking Hotel Rooms"
 Andy Husted – choir, chorus
 Robert Lloyd Martin – choir, chorus
 Jack Parker – guitar, soloist
 Seth Alan Roberts – backing vocals, layout design

Production
Stephen Egerton – producer
Gavin MacKillop – producer
Mauro Rubbi – engineer
Joe Sib – A&R

Chart positions
Album - Billboard (North America)

References

MxPx albums
2005 albums
SideOneDummy Records albums